Club Deportivo Praviano is a football team based in Pravia in the autonomous community of Asturias in Spain. Founded in 1949, the team plays in Tercera Division RFEF - Gr. 2. The club's home ground is Santa Catalina, which has a capacity of 2,000 spectators.

History
The best success of the club was in the 1965–66 season, when it got champion of the Asturian Group of Tercera División and played the promotion playoffs to Segunda División. It failed in the first round to Club Ferrol by 5–0 and 1–3.

In 2014, Praviano qualified for the promotion play-offs to Segunda División B but was eliminated in the first round by UD Socuéllamos.

In June 2019, the club signed a collaboration agreement with Real Oviedo, thus becoming their second reserve team. The terms of the agreement changed since 2020 and it is only an affiliated team.

Season to season

29 seasons in Tercera División
2 season in Tercera División RFEF

Notes

References

External links
Profile
Profile

Football clubs in Asturias
Association football clubs established in 1949
1949 establishments in Spain
Real Oviedo